Sharrieff Shah Sr. is an American football coach and former player as well as lawyer and NFLPA certified agent. He is currently the special teams coordinator and cornerbacks coach at the University of Utah.

College football career
Shah was a four-year letterman for the Utes from 1990 to 1993. He started at strong safety all four years, but unfortunately suffered a career-ending neck injury three games in to his senior season. Shah earned All-WAC honors in his sophomore and junior seasons. He was named the Sports Illustrated National Defensive Player of the Week and WAC Player of the Week in Utah's 1991 win over Oregon State, when he contributed 13 tackles, five tackles for loss, three sacks and two forced fumbles. Shah's performance against OSU still ranks in the top five in Utah's single-game record book in four different categories: tackles for loss, forced fumbles, sacks and total lost yards (30).

He also ran indoor track for the Utes, competing in the 60-yard dash and long jump from 1990 to 1992. He qualified for the WAC Indoor Track and Field Championships all three years.

Legal career
Following his playing days, Shah continued his education, eventually earning his Juris Doctor degree from Utah, before practicing law for twelve years in Utah. He started as a commercial litigator before transitioning to a trial lawyer specializing in medical malpractice and catastrophic automobile accidents. He was also a certified agent through the NFLPA, representing and training several NFL players. On top of that, Shah served as the sideline reporter for Utah's flagship radio station, and served as a sideline analyst for local television stations for three seasons.

Coaching career
In 2012, Shah returned to coaching when he was hired by Kyle Whittingham as the cornerbacks coach at Utah. Since then, he has continued coaching the corners while also serving as the co-special teams coordinator from 2016 through 2018, before being promoted to sole special teams coordinator prior to the 2019 season.

Shah has developed a reputation for being able to develop converted cornerbacks into highly successful players. Keith McGill (safety), Eric Rowe (safety), Brian Allen (wide receiver), Dominique Hatfield (wide receiver), and Josh Nurse (wide receiver – safety) are five examples of players that converted to cornerback at Utah, before stints in the NFL. Leading up to the Rose Bowl game on January 1, 2022, Shah was asked about converting players to cornerback for the game due to the large amount of injuries, but he said they were instead asking experienced players to do more.

In 2015, Shah was named Defensive Backs Coach of the Week by CoachingSearch.com twice, after wins against Michigan and California. He has also coached Jaylon Johnson and Julian Blackmon to All-American honors as defensive backs, and Kaelin Clay as a return specialist.

Personal life
Shah married his wife, Jen Shah, known for The Real Housewives of Salt Lake City, in August 1994, after meeting in college. Sharrieff Jr. played cornerback for his father at Utah from 2013 to 2016.

References

1971 births
Living people
American football defensive backs
Utah Utes football coaches
Utah Utes football players
21st-century American lawyers